Durj is a 2019 Pakistani Urdu-language mystery thriller film, written and directed by Shamoon Abbasi and produced by Dodi Khan.The film stars Shamoon Abbasi, Sherry Shah, Maira Khan, Dodi Khan, Nouman Javaid and Hafeez Ali. The film is based on true events and a large part of it is about cannibalism.

Plot
The opening scene of Shamoon Abbasi's latest film, Durj is reminiscent of The Silence of the Lambs, the psychological thriller in which Agent Clarice Starling (Jodie Foster), an FBI behavioral science trainee, is provided access to an incarcerated cannibalistic serial killer, Dr Hannibal Lecter (Anthony Hopkins). 
In Durj, Dr Farah Maira Khan, a Pakistani psychologist, gets access to a notorious recaptured cannibal, Gul Buksh Shamoon Abbasi, incarcerated in a high security prison. While in Agent Starling's case the intent was to delve into Lecter's mind and secure his help in capturing another twisted serial killer, Dr Farah's is to find her missing journalist husband. And she strongly suspects Buksh might have the answer.

Throwing her professional career and caution to the winds, Farah manages to kidnap a chained Buksh from solitary confinement and takes him to a place where she can grill him. While the entire local elite police force is activated to search for them, Farah tries to elicit answers from the serial cannibal – but it is not that simple. Hardened by years of societal neglect and police brutality, Buksh responds to her aggression with amusement, and turns the tables on her, forcing her to listen to aspects of his life she would rather not know or hear.

If the hair-raising horror in The Silence of the Lambs made audiences feel fairly queasy, Durj does not indulge in depicting gory details – there are only suggestions of it. And yet the hideousness of digging up graves, hunting for humans and, cooking and devouring their flesh are all creatively implied – the hallmark of a talented director. Producer Shamoon Abbasi has not only directed the film, but also written the screenplay and played the villainous lead as well.

Inspired by two actual cases of cannibalism in Pakistan, particularly that of a pair of brothers from Bhakkar who devoured over a 100 corpses and were set free despite their dastardly crimes, solely because no law exists against cannibalism in Pakistan's penal code. Shamoon Abbasi offers an interesting take in his latest psychological horror-thriller, that is – as bizarre as it may sound – almost humane, and without glorifying the subject.

Durj must be lauded for its creativity and commitment, more so since it's a low-budget film that has been shot against the breathtaking barren backdrop of Balochistan and parts of Sindh. However, there are glitches in certain sections of the story's timeline, that make a few of the sequences confusing. The weakest link in the story is Dr Farah's character, and her dialogues. Her acting is below par compared to the others and she does not come across as a psychologist. By comparison, model-turned-actress, Sherry Shah’s physical transformation and performance as Laali is palpable. Shah gained 18kg and allowed her long locks to be shorn for the role.

Cast
 Shamoon Abbasi as Gul Bakhsh
 Sherry Shah as Laali
 Maira Khan as Farah
 Nouman Javaid
 Dodi Khan
 Hafeez Ali

Production
In an interview with Dawn News, Abbasi stated that the film was inspired by true events which took place in Punjab and that although the film is based on Cannibalism it has multiple stories merged into one; "Durj's plot does not just revolve around cannibalism, it is about a cannibal but we have multiple stories. There are three stories which merge into one." The film crew had to research which took about a year to collect data on cases before starting work on the story line.

See also
 Shamoon Abbasi
 List of Pakistani films of 2019

References

External links 
 
 

2019 films
2010s Urdu-language films
Pakistani action thriller films
Films about revenge
Pakistani thriller films
Pakistani mystery films